Comstock Park is an unincorporated community and census-designated place (CDP) in Kent County in the U.S. state of Michigan.  The population was 10,088 at the 2010 census.  The community is located within Alpine Township to the west and Plainfield Township to the east. 

The community is part of the Grand Rapids metropolitan area, with the city of Walker to the south and Grand Rapids just to the southeast.  Comstock Park is the home of the West Michigan Whitecaps, an affiliate of the Detroit Tigers, who play their games at LMCU Ballpark.  The Fred Meijer White Pine Trail State Park also passes through the community.

History
In 1838, a settlement known as North's Mill was established by Daniel North. The name changed to Mill Creek in 1848. The area became a major transportation hub, serving both the Grand Rapids and Indiana Railroad and Chicago and Western Indiana Railroad, and set the tone for becoming the northern Grand Rapids-area crossroads it is today. It was renamed Comstock Park in 1906 after politician Charles C. Comstock, who served the district in the U.S. House of Representatives for one term from 1885–1887.

Geography

The Grand River flows just east of the community.

Transportation

Bus
 Interurban Transit Partnership has routes through the community.

Major highways

Education
Comstock Park Public Schools serves the majority of the community, while Kenowa Hills Public Schools serves a smaller western portion of the community.  The Kent District Library KDL Service Center is near Comstock Park in Plainfield Township.

Demographics

As of the census of 2000, there were 10,674 people, 4,441 households, and 2,513 families residing in the community. The racial makeup of the community was 87.30% White, 3.91% African American, 0.77% Native American, 1.92% Asian, 0.06% Pacific Islander, 3.33% from other races, and 2.73% from two or more races. Hispanic or Latino of any race were 7.22% of the population.

Of the 4,441 households, 29.5% had children under the age of 18 living with them, 39.5% were married couples living together, 12.0% had a female householder with no husband present, and 43.4% were not families. About 27.3% of all households were made up of individuals, and 4.7% had someone living alone who was 65 years of age or older.  The average household size was 2.40 and the average family size was 2.98.

In the community, the population was distributed as with 23.8% under the age of 18, 20.4% from 18 to 24, 31.8% from 25 to 44, 16.5% from 45 to 64, and 7.6% who were 65 years of age or older.  The median age was 27 years. For every 100 females, there were 101.9 males.  For every 100 females age 18 and over, there were 99.5 males.

The median income for a household in the community was $40,202, and for a family was $47,154. Males had a median income of $36,076 versus $26,331 for females. The per capita income for the community was $19,911.  About 7.9% of families and 9.7% of the population were below the poverty line, including 12.7% of those under age 18 and 2.2% of those age 65 or over.

References

External links

 Comstock Park Downtown Development Authority

Unincorporated communities in Michigan
Unincorporated communities in Kent County, Michigan
Census-designated places in Michigan
Census-designated places in Kent County, Michigan
Grand Rapids metropolitan area
Populated places established in 1838
1838 establishments in Michigan